Cenchritis is a genus of sea snails, marine gastropod mollusks in the family Littorinidae, the winkles or periwinkles.

Species
Species within the genus Cenchritis include:
 Cenchritis antonii (Philippi, R.A., 1846)
 Cenchritis coronatus Valenciennes, A., 1832
 Cenchritis cumingii 
 Cenchritis cumingii cumingii (Philippi, R.A., 1846)
 Cenchritis cumingii luchuanus (Pilsbry, H.A., 1901)
 Cenchritis cumingii spinulosus (Philippi, R.A., 1847)
 Cenchritis granosus (Philippi, R.A., 1846)
 Cenchritis malaccanus (Philippi, R.A.)
 Cenchritis muricatus (Linnaeus, 1758)
 Cenchritis niuensis (Reid, D.G. & Geller, 1997)
 Cenchritis nodulosus Pfeiffer, L., 1839 	
 Cenchritis pagodus (Linnaeus, C., 1758)
 Cenchritis rugosus Wood, W., 1828 		
 Cenchritis rusticus (Philippi, R.A., 1846)
 Cenchritis tectumpersicum (Linnaeus, C., 1758)
 Cenchritis viviparus (Rosewater, J., 1982)

References

External links

Littorinidae